The Castle of Torres Novas is a medieval castle in the civil parish of Torres Novas (São Pedro), Lapas e Ribeira Branca, municipality of Torres Novas, Portuguese district of Santarém. 

It is classified as a National Monument.

Torres Novas
Torres Novas
National monuments in Santarém District
Buildings and structures in Torres Novas